Eddie Harris Sings the Blues is an album by American jazz saxophonist Eddie Harris recorded in 1972 and released on the Atlantic label.

Reception

The Allmusic review called the album "Another fascinating installment in Harris' long Atlantic period".

Track listing
All compositions by Eddie Harris except as indicated
 "Please Let Me Go" - 7:10 
 "Ten Minutes to Four" - 4:57 
 "A Child Is Born" (Thad Jones) - 3:50 
 "Walk With Me" - 4:20 
 "Eddie Sings the Blues" - 12:30 
 "Giant Steps" (John Coltrane) - 8:38

Personnel
Eddie Harris - tenor saxophone, varitone
Muhal Richard Abrams - electric piano
Ronald Muldrow - electric guitar (tracks 1, 2 & 4-6)
Rufus Reid - bass, electric bass (tracks 1, 2 & 4-6)
Billy James - drums, boobam (tracks 1, 2 & 4-6) 
Burgess Gardner, Frank Gordon - trumpet (tracks 4 & 5)
Steve Galloway - trombone (tracks 4 & 5)
Willie Henderson - baritone saxophone (tracks 4 & 5)
Edmund Lee Bauer, Sol Bobrov, E. Zlatoff Mirsky - violin (tracks 4 & 5)
Bruce K. Hayden, Harold K. Kupper - viola (tracks 4 & 5)
Karl B. Fruh - cello (tracks 4 & 5)
Andre Fischer - drums (track 4) 
Marshall Thompson - percussion (track 4 & 6)
Vivian Harrell, Marilyn Haywood, Mary Ann Stewart - backing vocals
Richard Evans - arranger (tracks 1, 4 & 5)

References 

Eddie Harris albums
1972 albums
Atlantic Records albums